Morpho godarti, or Godart's morpho, is a Neotropical butterfly found in Peru and Bolivia.

Etymology
The butterfly was named to honour the French entomologist Jean Baptiste Godart.

References
Le Moult (E.) & Réal (P.), 1962-1963. Les Morpho d'Amérique du Sud et Centrale, Editions du cabinet entomologique E. Le Moult, Paris.
Paul Smart, 1976 The Illustrated Encyclopedia of the Butterfly World in Color. London, Salamander: Encyclopedie des papillons. Lausanne, Elsevier Sequoia (French language edition)   page 235 fig. 6 (Bolivia)

External links
"Morpho Fabricius, 1807" at Markku Savela's Lepidoptera and Some Other Life Forms with taxonomy and subspecies
Butterflies of America Images of type and other specimens of Morpho menelaus godartii.

Morpho
Nymphalidae of South America
Taxa named by Félix Édouard Guérin-Méneville
Butterflies described in 1844